Interferometric microscopy or imaging interferometric microscopy is the concept of microscopy which
is related to holography, synthetic-aperture imaging, and off-axis-dark-field illumination techniques.
Interferometric microscopy allows enhancement of resolution of optical microscopy due to interferometric (holographic)
registration of several partial images (amplitude and phase) and the numerical combining.

Combining of partial images
In interferometric microscopy, the image of a micro-object is synthesized numerically as a coherent combination
of partial images with registered amplitude and phase.
For registration of partial images, a conventional holographic set-up is used with a reference wave, as is usual in optical holography. Capturing multiple exposures allows the numerical emulation of a large numerical aperture objective from images obtained with an objective lens with smaller-value numerical aperture.
Similar techniques allows scanning and precise detection of small particles.
As the combined image keeps both amplitude and phase information, the interferometric microscopy can be especially efficient for the phase objects, allowing detection of light variations of index of refraction, which cause the phase shift or the light passing through for a small fraction of a radian.

Non-optical waves
Although the Interferometric microscopy has been demonstrated only for optical images (visible light), this technique may find application in high resolution atom optics, or optics of neutral atom beams (see Atomic de Broglie microscope), where the Numerical aperture is usually very limited
.

See also
 Digital holographic microscopy
 Holography
 Numerical Aperture
 Raman microscope
 Diffraction limited

References

Microscopy
Interferometry
Atomic, molecular, and optical physics
Holography